The 2020 South Carolina Gamecocks softball team represents the University of South Carolina in the 2020 NCAA Division I softball season. The Gamecocks play their home games at Carolina Softball Stadium.

Previous season

The Gamecocks finished the 2019 season 38–19 overall, and 9–14 in the SEC to finish eleventh in the conference. The Gamecocks went 2–2 in the Tallahassee Regional during the 2019 NCAA Division I softball tournament.

Preseason

SEC preseason poll
The SEC preseason poll was released on January 15, 2020.

Schedule and results

Source:
*Rankings are based on the team's current ranking in the NFCA poll.

Rankings

References

South Carolina
South Carolina Gamecocks softball seasons
South Carolina Gamecocks softball